Benjamin Ray Bailey (born October 30, 1970) is an American comedian. 

He is best known for hosting the Emmy Award-winning game show Cash Cab in New York City.

Early life
Bailey was born in Bowling Green, Kentucky, and raised in Chatham Borough, New Jersey. 

He was born the younger of two siblings. 

He graduated in 1988 from Chatham Borough High School as part of the school's 76th and final graduating class. 

He attended Old Dominion University in Norfolk, Virginia, before moving to Los Angeles in 1993. 

Career
According to Bailey, he was telling stories with some comedians after hours at The Comedy Store when Skip E. Lowe, who was emceeing at the club, found his stories humorous and offered him an opportunity at stand-up.

Bailey is the host of the American version of Cash Cab, a TV game show played in a taxicab that Bailey drives around New York City, broadcast on the Discovery Channel and Bravo. 

He also recently made an appearance on the new Shovio.com's TalkBackTV. He narrated the Discovery Channel's series Smash Lab.

From 2011 to 2012, Bailey was the host of Who's Still Standing? on NBC. 

On May 13, 2012, it was announced that the show would not be renewed for a second season due to high production costs. 

He does television commercials for Michigan electric/natural gas company DTE Energy & ALDI.

Personal life
Bailey lives in Morristown, New Jersey. 

He met his ex-wife, Laurence, in a pub in Morristown in the 1990s. 

The couple married in 1997 and divorced in 2012.  They have two children. 

Bailey is a licensed taxi driver in New York City.

Awards
As the host of Cash Cab, Ben received Daytime Emmy nominations in 2007, 2008, 2009, 2010, 2011 & 2013 for "Outstanding Game Show Host", winning in 2010, 2011 & 2013. 

The show took home honors at the Daytime Emmy awards for Best Game Show in 2008, 2009, and 2010.

Appearances

 30 Rock (2010)
 After the Catch (2009)
 Aspen Comedy Arts Festival in 2002/2004
 Bad Meat as an FBI agent
 Bertcast #331 with Bert Kreischer
 Blue Bloods S11E13 (2021) 
 Brain Games (National Geographic)
 Caroline and Friends (2018)
 Cash Cab - host of U.S. version (2005–2012, 2017–2020)
 Comedy Central Presents
 Delivery Man (2013)
 Don't Shoot The Pharmacist
 The Haney Project: Ray Romano 
 Friends of the People (2015)
 Hope & Faith
 The Knights of Prosperity
 Last Call with Carson Daly
 The Late Late Show with Craig Ferguson
 Law & Order: Special Victims Unit
 MADtv
 Premium Blend on Comedy Central
 Road Rage and Accidental Ornithologist
 Smash Lab - narrator (2nd season)
 They're Made Out of Meat
 The Tonight Show with Jay Leno
 The Today Show (April 2, 2008)
 Tough Crowd with Colin Quinn
 Unforgettable S04E09 (January 2016)
 Who's Still Standing? - host
 The World Stands Up

References

External links
 Ben Bailey's official website
 
 Ben Bailey profile, msgnetworks.com

1970 births
American game show hosts
American male comedians
American podcasters
American stand-up comedians
American taxi drivers
Chatham High School (New Jersey) alumni
Daytime Emmy Award for Outstanding Game Show Host winners
Living people
Old Dominion University alumni
People from Bowling Green, Kentucky
People from Chatham Borough, New Jersey
21st-century American comedians
Comedians from Kentucky
Comedians from New Jersey
Discovery Channel people